In the mathematical field of group theory, a group G is residually finite or finitely approximable if for every element g that is not the identity in G  there is a homomorphism h from G to a finite group, such that 

There are a number of equivalent definitions:
A group is residually finite if for each non-identity element in the group, there is a normal subgroup of finite index not containing that element.
A group is residually finite if and only if the intersection of all its subgroups of finite index is trivial.  
A group is residually finite if and only if the intersection of all its normal subgroups of finite index is trivial.
A group is residually finite if and only if it can be embedded inside the direct product of a family of finite groups.

Examples 

Examples of groups that are residually finite are finite groups, free groups, finitely generated nilpotent groups, polycyclic-by-finite groups, finitely generated linear groups, and fundamental groups of compact 3-manifolds.

Subgroups of residually finite groups are residually finite, and direct products of residually finite groups are residually finite. Any inverse limit of residually finite groups is residually finite. In particular, all profinite groups are residually finite.

Examples of non-residually finite groups can be constructed using the fact that all finitely generated residually finite groups are Hopfian groups. For example the Baumslag–Solitar group B(2,3) is not Hopfian, and therefore not residually finite.

Profinite topology 

Every group G may be made into a topological group by taking as a basis of open neighbourhoods of the identity, the collection of all normal subgroups of finite index in G.  The resulting topology is called the profinite topology on G.  A group is residually finite if, and only if, its profinite topology is Hausdorff.

A group whose cyclic subgroups are closed in the profinite topology is said to be .
Groups each of whose finitely generated subgroups are closed in the profinite topology are called subgroup separable (also LERF, for locally extended residually finite).
A group in which every conjugacy class is closed in the profinite topology is called conjugacy separable.

Varieties of residually finite groups 

One question is: what are the properties of a variety all of whose groups are residually finite? Two results about these are:

 Any variety comprising only residually finite groups is generated by an A-group.
 For any variety comprising only residually finite groups, it contains a finite group such that all members are embedded in a direct product of that finite group.

See also 
 Residual property (mathematics)

External links
 Article with proof of some of the above statements

Infinite group theory
Properties of groups